The Software Peter principle is used in software engineering to describe a dying project which has become too complex to be understood even by its own developers.

It is well known in the industry as a silent killer of projects, but by the time the symptoms arise it is often too late to do anything about it.  Good managers can avoid this disaster by establishing clear coding practices where unnecessarily complicated code and design is avoided.

The name is used in the book C++ FAQs (see below), and is derived from the Peter principle – a theory about incompetence in hierarchical organizations.

Causes

Loss of conceptual integrity

The conceptual integrity of software is a measure of how well it conforms to a single, simple set of design principles, according to The Mythical Man Month by Fred Brooks.  When done properly, it provides the most functionality using the simplest idioms. It makes software easier to use by making it simple to create and learn.

Conceptual integrity is achieved when the software’s design proceeds from a small number of agreeing individuals. For software to maintain conceptual integrity, the design must be controlled by a single, small group of people who understand the code (including the nature of how all the subroutines and variables interact) in depth.

In projects without a strong software architecture team, the task of design is often  combined with the task of implementation and is implicitly delegated among the individual software developers .  Under these circumstances, developers are less likely to sacrifice personal interests in favor of the interests of the product.  The complexity of the product grows as a result of developers adding new designs and altering earlier ones to reflect changes in fashion and individual taste.

Programmer incompetence

Good software developers understand the importance of communicating with people over communicating with the computer, according to Code Complete by Steve McConnell. On average, 85 percent of a programmer's time is spent communicating with people, while only 15 percent is spent communicating with the computer.  Maintenance programmers spend 50 to 60 percent of their time trying to understand the code they have to maintain and a software program will have, on average, 10 generations of maintenance programmers in its lifetime.

Programmer inexperience

Programmers sometimes make implementation choices that work but have unintended negative consequences.  The most common of these mistakes are cataloged and referred to as smells in the book Refactoring by Martin Fowler. Over time, many such implementation choices degrade the software’s design, making it increasingly difficult to understand.

See also
Anti-patterns
Death march (project management)
Greenspun's tenth rule
Project management
Software development process
Obfuscation (software)

References 
 C++ FAQs by Cline, Lomow, and Girou, Addison-Wesley 1999 
 Brooks, F., The Mythical Man-Month, Addison-Wesley Longman Inc., 1995.
 McConnell, S., Code Complete, Microsoft Press, 1993
 Fowler, M., Refactoring, Addison-Wesley, 2000

Adages
Software project management